Cyperus kituiensis is a species of sedge that is native to eastern parts of Africa.

See also 
 List of Cyperus species

References 

kituiensis
Plants described in 2004
Flora of Kenya